Seth Rogen's Hilarity for Charity is a stand-up comedy special to raise awareness for Alzheimer's disease, that premiered on Netflix on April 6, 2018.

Cast
 Seth Rogen
 Ike Barinholtz
 Michael Che
 Sacha Baron Cohen
 Jeff Goldblum
 Tiffany Haddish
 Chris Hardwick
 Nick Kroll
 Post Malone
 John Mulaney
 The Muppets
 Matt Vogel as Kermit the Frog/Floyd Pepper/Camilla the Chicken
 Eric Jacobson as Fozzie Bear/Sam Eagle/Animal
 Dave Goelz as Gonzo/Waldorf
 Peter Linz as Walter/Statler
 Kumail Nanjiani
 Chelsea Peretti
 Craig Robinson and The Nasty Delicious
 Lauren Miller Rogen
 Justin Roiland as Char
 Zach Hadel as Ity
 Sarah Silverman
 Michelle Wolf

Production
The comedy special was filmed at the Hollywood Palladium on March 24, 2018.

References

External links
 
 

2018 films
Netflix specials
American films with live action and animation
The Muppets films
Puppet films
American comedy films
2010s English-language films
2010s American films